District 2 is an electoral district in Malta.  It was established in 1921. Its boundaries have changed many times but it currently consists of the localities of Birgu, Senglea, Cospicua, Żabbar, Kalkara, Xgħajra and part of Fgura.

Representatives

1889-1921: one seat

1921-present: five seats

References 

 

Districts of Malta